Universal basic services (UBS) are a form of social security in which all citizens or residents of a community, region, or country receive unconditional access to a range of free, basic, public services, funded by taxes and provided by a government or public institution.

History 
Universal Basic Services is a development of the welfare state model. The term appeared in 2017 in press and the first modelling in a report from University College London (UCL)'s Institute for Global Prosperity. The British Labour Party welcomed the report and announced in 2018 that UBS would be incorporated into the party's platform.

UBS inclusion rationale 
Universal Basic Services are provided on the basis that they are necessary to sustain and enable each citizen's material safety, opportunity to contribute, or participate in the decision-making processes of their community, region or country, even if they lack any financial income. The UBS model extends the notion of a social safety net to include those elements necessary to fulfil a larger role in society.
 
To substantiate inclusion in a UBS provision services meet at least one of these conditions:
 necessary to maintain the individual's or the society's material safety
 necessary to enable the individual's personal effort to use their skills and abilities to contribute to their society, either for remuneration or not
 necessary to allow the individual to participate in the political system(s) within which they live
The following table represents rationales used for the inclusion of certain services in a UBS definition:

Service content 
The specific content of any set of UBS varies according to the resources available to the society and their political definitions of what constitutes basic provision - see UBS Inclusion Rationale.

Many societies already provide some elements of UBS, such as public education and public healthcare services.

Service definitions and examples

Shelter 
 Homeless shelter
 Public housing
 Right to housing
Public housing are built to provide affordable or subsidized housing for lower income earners. This is inline with rationale behind the UBS, to sustain social inclusion. UN-Habitat estimate that approximately 40% of the total world population will lack access to affordable housing by 2030.

Sustenance 
 Food bank
 Food security
 Human right to water and sanitation
 Right to food
 Supplemental Nutrition Assistance Program
 Soup kitchen

Health and care 
Services that support health, and services which provide for care of disabled, elderly and others.
 Publicly funded health care
 Universal health care
In The Case for Universal Basic Services Coote and Percy argue for the expansion of the Care service definition to include childcare.

Education 
Schooling and training.
 Free education
 Public education
 Universal access to education

Transport 
Local transport to access other services, shops and employment.
 Free public transport

Information 
Access to communications that enable participation in society as well as access to the other services.
 Freedom of information
 Municipal wireless network
 Public library

Legal 
The Legal category UBS is a broad definition to include safety services, legal assistance and the apparatus necessary to sustain the society's legal system and political system. The courts, assemblies, political salaries, civil services and other aspects of the structure of the society are included in the definition of Legal UBS.
 Policing
 Firefighting
 Legal aid
 Courts
 Social services agencies

Local service definitions
UBS are designed and delivered by governments and institutions which tailor the exact content of the services to meet the particular circumstances of the local community.

Funding
In the standardised definition of UBS the cost of the services is funded by revenues derived from income taxes, which are hypothecated to the delivery of the UBS.

Most UBS services in societies around the world today are funded out of general government revenues, such as publicly funded healthcare.

Model costing
In October 2017 the Institute for Global Prosperity at University College London (UCL) produced a report modelling the cost of UBS for the United Kingdom.
The report modelled funding the UBS services (£42.16Bn) from a reduction in the Personal Tax Allowance.

Cost justifications for UBS
The cost of extending public services as universal entitlements is justified through some combination of the following savings:
 increased productivity through greater support for deeper specialisation 
 substitution of cash benefits
 enhanced efficiency of delivery resulting from local design and demand management
 long term savings in labour costs as UBS substitute for increases in pay

Labour market effects
The two most common effects on operagraphics (labour markets) are:
 increased flexibility through enhanced access to job opportunities (e.g. transport access)
 reduced upward pressure on labour rates through the substitution of direct financial cost ("social wage")
 The 2017 UCL report shows potential cost replacement of 80% of average pay for the lowest income decile

Environmental benefits
UBS can lead to lower emissions, particularly through greater use of public transport.

Criticisms and conditions
 Responsive, effective and accountable local government – with financial autonomy – is necessary for the practical implementation of UBS
 UBS startup requires some increase in real costs that need to be financed before the labour market effects that could reduce those costs are activated
 UBS may be an inefficient method to cover the personal and necessarily individual living costs associated with needs such as toiletries, requiring any UBS to be supplemented by some form of cash transfers or credit system that can be used by citizens to satisfy personally specific living costs. This component could be delivered as a form of basic income, as modelled in the UCL report, albeit at the low end of the scale within which basic income distributions are commonly proposed.

References 

Employment compensation
Labor relations
Public administration
Public services
Social security
Universalism
Welfare state